John Chan is the chairman of Transport International Holdings Limited and former Hong Kong Secretary for Education.

John Chan may also refer to:

John Chan, New Democratic Party candidate, 2008 Canadian federal election for Calgary Centre-North district
Claw (John Chan), DC Comics character
Johnny Chan (born 1957), American poker player
Johnny Chan (actor), Hong Kong actor

See also
John Chen (disambiguation)
Jackie Chan (disambiguation)